Sanborn is an unincorporated community in Dundy County, Nebraska, United States.

History
Sanborn was named for J. E. Sanborn, the original owner of the town site. A post office was established at Sanborn in 1906, and remained in operation until it was discontinued in 1929. Little now remains of the original town.

References

Populated places in Dundy County, Nebraska